Whew! is an American television game show that aired on CBS from April 23, 1979, until May 30, 1980. It was hosted by Tom Kennedy and announced by Rod Roddy. Gameplay features contestants correcting "bloopers", factual statements in which one word has been changed.

The game was created by Jay Wolpert. Production was initially credited to the Bud Austin Company, then later changed to Jay Wolpert Productions in association with Burt Sugarman Inc. The animated opening sequence, featuring a woman named Bridget evading an array of villains, was produced by Hanna-Barbera. In September 2021, TV network Buzzr began reruns of Whew!

Gameplay

Main game
The gameboard consisted of five rows ("levels") of five squares each, with values from $10 to $50 in $10 increments, and a sixth level of three squares with values of $200, $350, and $500. Levels were numbered from the bottom of the board, working upward. Two contestants (or during the later half of the run, two teams of a celebrity and a civilian) were told the categories for the first two rounds of play at the start of the match. The current challenger (or the winner of a coin toss, if there was no returning champion) decided whether to play as the charger or the blocker for the first round, and the champion took the other role. The charger was led offstage to a soundproof booth, and the blocker then placed six blocks on the board. Up to three blocks could be placed on any of the first five levels, and no more than one on the sixth.

The charger was brought back onstage and given 60 seconds to advance through all six levels by correcting "bloopers", or factual statements in which one word had been changed. (Example: "The B&O was the first American passenger smell", with "railroad" as the correct answer.) The charger started on level one by choosing one of its squares. If a blooper was hidden there, it was revealed on that space's trilon and read out. The incorrect word was marked with an underline, and was the only part that the charger needed to correct. A correct answer added the value to the charger's score for the match and allowed him/her to move to the next level, while a miss or failure to respond within three seconds required him/her to choose another square. Uncovering a block added the amount to the blocker's score and incurred a five-second penalty before the charger could continue. If the charger revealed all the squares on a level without a correct answer, the level was "exhausted" and the charger was allowed to advance.

If the charger believed that he/she was running short on time, and had not yet reached level six, he/she could call a "Longshot". The clock was stopped, the charger immediately advanced to level six, and the blocker hid one secret block on that level in addition to the one that may have already been placed there. The charger then selected one square and attempted to correct its blooper if one was hidden there. The charger won the round by either clearing all six levels or successfully completing a Longshot. If the charger ran out of time, or either hit a block or failed to correct a blooper after calling a Longshot, the blocker won the round. The charger could not call a Longshot after reaching level six or during the five-second penalty for hitting a block, but could do so at any other time, even while a blooper was read.

The contestants traded positions for the second round. If a third round was needed, Kennedy revealed its category at that time and the champion decided who played which role. The first contestant to win two rounds won the match, the money accumulated from charging and blocking, and advanced to the Gauntlet of Villains. The runner-up received consolation prizes.

The Gauntlet of Villains
The contestant stood at the beginning of a path lined with 10 cardboard caricatures of stereotypical villains, each with one arm raised as a barrier. He/she had 60 seconds, plus one extra second for every $100 earned in the main game, to reach the end of the path by correcting bloopers. If the contestant either responded incorrectly or failed to respond within two seconds, the correct answer was shown on a small screen embedded in the current villain's chest and Kennedy read a new blooper. A correct response led to the villain's arm being lowered so that the contestant could advance to the next one.

The contestant won $100 for each villain passed, or $25,000 for completing the Gauntlet. Since CBS had a $25,000 winnings limit in effect for its game shows at the time, any contestant who won this bonus round immediately retired from the show. Unsuccessful champions played the main game again. Later, an additional rule forced the champion to retire after five attempts at the bonus round.

The villains in the Gauntlet were, from start to finish:
 Alphonse the Gangster
 Bruno the Headsman 
 Mr. Van Louse the Landlord
 Nero the Fiddler
 Count Nibbleneck the Vampire
 Frank and his little friend Stein
 Kid Rotten the Gunslinger
 Jeremy Swash the Pirate
 Dr. Deranged the Mad Scientist
 Lucretia the Witch

Production information
Whew! was taped in Hollywood, California at CBS Television City, with production alternating between Studios 31 and 33.

Broadcast history
Whew!s debut was part of a shakeup of the overall CBS daytime schedule. The show was given the spot on the schedule that had previously belonged to Match Game. At the time, the long-running Match Game had been airing at 4:00 p.m. Eastern in the last network-programmed daytime slot of the day.

CBS’s morning lineup featured All in the Family reruns at 10:00 a.m., the hour-long game show The Price Is Right at 10:30 a.m., and the veteran soap opera Love of Life at 11:30 a.m. The network added Whew! to its morning lineup and placed it at 10:30 a.m following reruns of All in the Family. The Price Is Right moved thirty minutes later to 11:00 a.m.—which it still occupies to date—and relegated Love of Life to the 4:00 p.m. slot for Match Game, which resulted in the soap's cancellation months later. Whew!s actual run time, with commercials, was 25 minutes. The remaining time (in between the show and The Price Is Right) was taken up by the five-minute CBS Mid-Morning News with Douglas Edwards.

Its network competition was restricted to NBC’s daytime lineup, as ABC did not program the 10:00 AM hour at the time (ABC affiliates and independent stations chose their own programs). From its premiere, Whew! went up against All Star Secrets until that series was cancelled. NBC then relocated Hollywood Squares, which it had been shuffling around the schedule for some time by 1979 (where it aired in three separate time slots that year alone). Both programs faced each other head to head for the remainder of the run of Whew!. Incidentally, Hollywood Squares was cancelled shortly after Whew! aired its finale.

After the final episode of Whew! aired, the series was replaced the following Monday by reruns of Alice, which remained in the 10:30a.m. timeslot until September 1982 (when Child's Play premiered).

Celebrity Whew! 
On November 5, 1979, in an attempt to increase the show's ratings, Whew! changed its format to accommodate the addition of celebrities to the game. Originally conceived as a three-week special series of episodes, the change instead became permanent on December 5 and the show adopted the title Celebrity Whew! to reflect it.

Each contestant was paired with one of the two celebrities and they both took turns charging. They shared blocking duties, with each of them placing three blocks when it was their turn. The rules were otherwise unchanged except, toward the end of the series, if one of the teams was able to win by sweeping the first two boards, they got to play the third board unopposed for bonus money with a randomly generated set of blocks.

In the Gauntlet of Villains, one member of the team took the first half and the other took the second half. As before, each $100 earned in the front game was worth one additional second on top of the base 60-second time, and completing the Gauntlet won $25,000 which retired the player immediately upon winning it.

Episode status
All episodes exist in the possession of Burt Sugarman, the current copyright holder of the Whew! program and format.

On August 10, 2021, it was announced that Whew! would air on Buzzr beginning September 5, 2021, with previously unaired episodes set to air weekdays beginning the following day. The show's return to TV marks the end of a 41-year absence after CBS canceled the series in 1980. Wink Martindale and game show producer John Ricci, Jr. both played a role in bringing the show to Buzzr.

Theme
The theme song was composed by Alan Thicke. Original recordings of the theme were presumed to have been lost until 2012, when they were discovered by the Museum of Television Production Music.

References

External links
 

1979 American television series debuts
1980 American television series endings
1970s American game shows
1980s American game shows
CBS original programming
English-language television shows
Television series by Jay Wolpert Enterprises